Rin Usami (宇佐見 りん、Hepburn: Usami Rin, born 16 May, 1999) is a Japanese novelist.

Career 

Usami was born in Numazu, Shizuoka, and raised in Kanagawa Prefecture. She was awarded Bungei Prize for her first work Kaka (かか) in 2019. She was successively awarded Mishima Yukio Prize for the same work, which made her the youngest holder of the prize. She was also awarded the 164th Akutagawa Prize for her second work Oshi, Moyu (推し、燃ゆ).

External links 

 Twitter - Usami's Twitter account

References 

Living people
1999 births
Japanese women novelists
21st-century Japanese women writers